The Smyth-Bland Regional Library (SBRL) is a library system that serves Smyth and Bland counties in Virginia, USA. The library system is within Region 1 of the Virginia Library Association (VLA).

Service Area 
According to the FY 2014 Institute of Museum and Library Services Data Catalog, the Library System has a service area population of 38,852 with one central library and three branch libraries.

Branches 
 Bland County Library (Bland)
 Chilhowie Public Library (Chilhowie)
 Saltville Public Library (Saltville)
 Smyth-Bland Regional Library (Marion)

References

External links 
 Smyth-Bland Regional Library 
 Friends of SBRL
 Smyth-Bland Regional Library blog
 Smyth Bland Regional Library Facebook page

Public libraries in Virginia